Gəncəli (also, Ganjali and Parcha-Ganjali) is a village in the Salyan District of Azerbaijan. The village forms part of the municipality of Piratman.

References 

Populated places in Salyan District (Azerbaijan)